Beaumont is a commune in the Corail Arrondissement, in the Grand'Anse department of Haiti. It has 12,486 inhabitants.

Locations in Beaumont commune include: Beaumont, Flandre and Lacadome.

External links
Haiti Support Foundation for Beaumont

References

Populated places in Grand'Anse (department)
Communes of Haiti